Andrés Mora Ibarra (May 25, 1955 – June 12, 2015) was a professional baseball outfielder. He continued to play professionally in Mexico until 1997 for the Saraperos de Saltillo, Tecolotes de Nuevo Laredo and Industriales de Monterrey, and ranks 3rd all time in home runs in Mexican League history. He was elected to the Mexican Professional Baseball Hall of Fame in 2003. He died on June 12, 2015 of pneumonia.

Sources

External links

1955 births
2015 deaths
Algodoneros de Guasave players 
Baltimore Orioles players
Baseball players from Coahuila
Cañeros de Los Mochis players
Cleveland Indians players
Deaths from pneumonia in Mexico
Industriales de Monterrey players
Major League Baseball outfielders
Major League Baseball players from Mexico
Mexican Baseball Hall of Fame inductees
Mexican expatriate baseball players in the United States
Mexican League baseball managers
Ostioneros de Guaymas players
People from Saltillo
Potros de Tijuana players
Rochester Red Wings players
Saraperos de Saltillo players
Tecolotes de los Dos Laredos players
Tecolotes de Nuevo Laredo players
Tuzos de Zacatecas players
Venados de Mazatlán players
Yaquis de Obregón players 
West Palm Beach Expos players